Abusejo is a village and municipality in the province of Salamanca, western Spain, part of the autonomous community of Castile and León. As of 2016 it had a population of 202 people.

References

Municipalities in the Province of Salamanca